Italian Canadian internment was the removal and internment of Italian Canadians during World War II following Italy's June 10, 1940, declaration of war against the United Kingdom. Through the War Measures Act, the government of Canadian Prime Minister William Lyon Mackenzie King gave itself the power to suspend habeas corpus, revoke rights, seize property and arrest those who were deemed a threat to the safety of Canada—labelling 31,000 Italian Canadians as "enemy aliens". Between 1940 and 1943, between 600 and 700 Italian Canadian men were arrested and sent to internment camps as potentially dangerous "enemy aliens" with alleged fascist connections. In the decades that followed, political apologies were made for the internment of Italian Canadians.

Enemy aliens

On June 10, 1940, following Italy's declaration of war against the United Kingdom, all fascist organizations in Canada were deemed illegal through the War Measures Act. They included the Casa D'Italia consulate on Beverley Street, the fascist newspaper Il Bolletino and the Dopolavoro (after work) social club. Casa D'Italia was seized by the Custodian of Enemy Alien Property and sold to the RCMP. According to Enemies Within: Italian and Other Internees in Canada and Abroad, edited by historians Franca Iacovetta, Roberto Perin and Angelo Principe, an estimated 3,500 Italian Canadians were known to have been members of local fascist groups.

Newspaper accounts of the day, such as the Ottawa Citizen, stated that the "enemy alien" status was immediately placed on non-resident Italians older than 16 years of age, and on Italian Canadians who became British subjects after September 1929—about 31,000 Italian Canadians. The category later expanded to include nationals of belligerent states naturalized after 1922. Those affected by the War Measures Act and Defense of Canada Regulations (DOCR) were forced to register with the RCMP and report to them on a monthly basis.

Between 1940 and 1943, between 600 and 700 Italian Canadian men were arrested and sent to internment camps as potentially dangerous "enemy aliens" with alleged fascist connections. While many Italian Canadians had initially supported fascism and Benito Mussolini's regime for its role in enhancing Italy's presence on the world stage, most Italians in Canada did not harbour any ill will against Canada and few remained committed followers of the fascist ideology.

Most of the Italian Canadian men were interned at Camp Petawawa (Camp 33) in Petawawa, Ontario, as well as camps in Minto, New Brunswick and Kananaskis, Alberta, for several years.

A notable internee was Hamilton, Ontario's notorious bootlegger Rocco Perri.

Legacy
In 1990, prime minister Brian Mulroney apologized for the war internment of Italian Canadians to a Toronto meeting of the National Congress of Italian Canadians: "On behalf of the government and the people of Canada, I offer a full and unqualified apology for the wrongs done to our fellow Canadians of Italian origin during World War II."

In May 2009, Massimo Pacetti introduced bill C-302, an "Act to recognize the injustice that was done to persons of Italian origin through their "enemy alien" designation and internment during the Second World War, and to provide for restitution and promote education on Italian Canadian history [worth $2.5 million]", which was passed by the House of Commons on April 28, 2010. Canada Post was also to issue a commemorative postage stamp commemorating the internment of Italian Canadian citizens, however, Bill C-302 did not pass through the necessary stages to become law.

In 2013, as a part of the permanent exhibition Italian Canadians as Enemy Aliens: Memories of World War II at the Columbus Centre in Toronto, funded by Villa Charities Inc and Citizenship and Immigration Canada, artist Harley Valentine created a monument recognizing the internments called "Riflessi: Italian Canadian Internment Memorial". The main statue is composed of several profiles—a (grand)father, internee, pregnant mother, and child—that combine to form a single figure in mirror polished stainless steel.

In September 2018, the RCMP planted a tree on the grounds of the Canadian Police College in Ottawa as a show of regret for their involvement with the internment of Italian Canadians.

On May 27, 2021, prime minister Justin Trudeau formally apologized for the war internment of Italian Canadians, at the House of Commons.

See also
Canada–Italy relations
Italian American internment
Ukrainian Canadian internment

References

External links
Barbed Wire and Mandolins, a National Film Board of Canada documentary on the Italian-Canadian internment
Tracing the forgotten history of Italian-Canadian internment camps, article on the same topic.
Antonio, a National Film Board of Canada documentary by Tony Ianzelo, about his own father's experiences during and after internment.
Italian Canadians as Enemy Aliens: Memories of World War II,
"Villa Charities Inc."
"Citizenship and Immigration Canada", funding sponsors of the "Riflessi" monument
"Harley Valentine's" artist renderings of the Riflessi monument

Canadian World War II crimes
Canada in World War II
Military history of Canada during World War II
Canadian people of Italian descent
Internments in Canada
Canada–Italy relations
Anti-Italian sentiment
Italian diaspora in Canada